The ailette (French language for little wing) was a component of thirteenth century knightly armour.  Usually made of cuir bouilli (sometimes of plate or parchment), ailettes were thick, quadrangular pieces of leather or wood that attached to the shoulders by means of silk or leather cord. Ailettes were usually flat and nearly rectangular in shape, and usually decorated with heraldic designs.

Ailettes made brief appearances between 1290 and 1325 before giving way to more protective joint plates that covered the joint gap in the shoulders.

The purpose of ailettes is a matter of disagreement amongst scholars. Some, such as Charles ffoulkes, claim that they enhanced protection to the neck, while others, like Ewart Oakeshott, argue that they were used primarily for decorative and heraldic reasons.

External links 
 Arador Armor Library description of ailettes
 Ailettes revisited a comparison of heraldic and defensive functions of ailettes
  A brief assorted reference on ailettes and other plate armor

See also

Western plate armour
Medieval armour